Marc Ereshefsky is a professor of philosophy at the University of Calgary, specializing in the philosophy of science and the philosophy of biology. His research focuses on issues on the intersection of philosophy and biology. Ereshefsky is specifically known for his work on taxonomy, systematics and natural kinds. His research has been supported by the Social Sciences and Humanities Research Council of Canada, the Canadian Institutes of Health Research, and the National Science Foundation.

Personal life
Ereshefsky lives in Calgary with his wife, two sons, Jacob and Josh, and their puppy. His favourite weekend activities include hiking in the nearby Rocky Mountains, and going for runs.

Publications
Books
 The Units of Evolution: Essays on the Nature of Species, edited with introductory essays for Bradford Books / MIT Press 1992 
 The Poverty of the Linnaean Hierarchy: A Philosophical Study of Biological Taxonomy. Cambridge University Press 2001, 2007.

References

External links

Living people
Philosophers of science
Philosophers of biology
Year of birth missing (living people)
Academic staff of the University of Calgary
21st-century American philosophers